Nataliya Orekhova  (born 28 September 1972) is a Russian freestyle skier. She was born in Moscow. She competed at the 1994, 1998, and 2002 Winter Olympics; in 2002 she placed seventh in women's aerials.

References

External links 
 

1972 births
Skiers from Moscow
Living people
Russian female freestyle skiers
Olympic freestyle skiers of Russia
Freestyle skiers at the 1994 Winter Olympics
Freestyle skiers at the 1998 Winter Olympics
Freestyle skiers at the 2002 Winter Olympics